The 1992 Eurocard Open was a men's ATP tennis tournament played on indoor carpet courts at the Hanns-Martin-Schleyer-Halle in Stuttgart, Germany that was part of the Championship Series of the 1992 ATP Tour. It was the third edition of the tournament and was held from 17 February until 23 February 1992. Seventh-seeded Goran Ivanišević won the singles title.

Finals

Singles
 Goran Ivanišević defeated  Stefan Edberg, 6–7(5–7), 6–3, 6–4, 6–4
 It was Ivanišević' 1st singles title of the year and 4th of his career.

Doubles
 Tom Nijssen /  Cyril Suk defeated  John Fitzgerald /  Anders Järryd, 6–3, 6–7, 6–3

References

External links
 ITF tournament edition details

Eurocard Open
1992 in German tennis
Eurocard Open